The Canadian Institutes of Health Research (CIHR; ; IRSC) is a federal agency responsible for funding health and medical research in Canada. Comprising 13 institutes, it is the successor to the Medical Research Council of Canada.

CIHR supports more than 13,000 researchers and trainees through grants, fellowships, scholarships, and other funding, as part of the federal government's investment in health research. The peer review process is a vital part of CIHR. Review by panels of peers from the research community ensures that proposals approved for funding by CIHR meet internationally accepted standards of scientific excellence.

Along with the Social Sciences and Humanities Research Council, and the Natural Sciences and Engineering Research Council, the CIHR forms the major source of federal government funding to post-secondary research and are collectively referred to as the "Tri-Council" or "Tri-Agency".

History 
CIHR was created by an Act of Parliament on June 7, 2000, bringing together existing government activities. CIHR's annual budget is approximately $1 billion.

In 2021, Carrie Bourassa, the scientific director of CIHR's Indigenous health arm, was placed on immediate leave after the Canadian Broadcasting Corporation (CBC) found no evidence to support her repeated claims of Indigenous ancestry.

Governance 
CIHR is a departmental corporation listed in Schedule II of the Financial Administration Act. As an arms' length agency of government, it is accountable to Parliament through the minister of health. CIHR is managed by the president and the 17 members of Governing Council, who are assisted by various Standing and Advisory Committees and a 7-member executive team.

President 
Alan Bernstein was the founding president of the agency (2000-2007), followed by Alain Beaudet (2008-2017). Michael Strong, an ALS researcher, was announced as the new president in June 2018.

Institute structure 
CIHR consists of 13 "virtual" institutes, each headed by a Scientific Director and assisted by an Institute Advisory Board. They work together to shape a national health research agenda for Canada. The institutes bring together researchers, health professionals, and policy-makers from voluntary health organizations, provincial government agencies, international research organizations, and industry and patient groups from across the country with a shared interest in improving the health of Canadians.

The work of the institutes embraces the four pillars of health research:
 biomedical;
 clinical;
 health services; and
 population health.

A major goal of the institutes is to forge relationships across disciplines to stimulate integrative, multifaceted research agendas that respond to society's health priorities while adhering to the highest ethical standards.

Member institutes
Each institute focuses on a specific area of research.
Institute of Aging
Institute of Cancer Research
Institute of Circulatory and Respiratory Health
Institute of Gender and Health
Institute of Genetics
Institute of Health Services and Policy Research
Institute of Human Development, Child and Youth Health
Institute of Indigenous Peoples' Health
Institute of Infection and Immunity
Institute of Musculoskeletal Health and Arthritis
Institute of Neurosciences, Mental Health and Addiction
Institute of Nutrition, Metabolism and Diabetes
Institute of Population and Public Health

COVID-19 
In June 2020, CIHR provided $109 million in funding to 139 research teams across Canada for COVID-19 research. On February 16, 2021, CIHR launched the CIHR-CEPI Leadership Award for Excellence in Vaccine Research for Infectious Diseases of Epidemic Potential, co-administered with the Coalition for Epidemic Preparedness Innovations (CEPI).

See also
 Canadian Foundation for Healthcare Improvement
 Canadian government scientific research organizations
 Canadian industrial research and development organizations
 Canadian university scientific research organizations
 EvidenceNetwork.ca
 Medical Research Council (UK)
 National Institutes of Health – US counterpart
 National Research Council of Canada

References

External links 
 

Medical research institutes in Canada
Health Canada
Federal departments and agencies of Canada
Funding bodies of Canada
2000 establishments in Canada
Government agencies established in 2000
Research funding agencies